RIP 19 (route d’intérêt provincial 19) is an unpaved, secondary road in the region of Analamanga, Madagascar. Due to its bad state of conservation, 4 hours are needed for this distance.

See also
List of roads in Madagascar
Transport in Madagascar

References

Roads in Analamanga
Roads in Madagascar